Atlanta International School (AIS) is a private elementary, middle and high school in Atlanta, Georgia, United States. An International Baccalaureate school, it was opened in 1985.

Faculty, parents and students at Atlanta International School represent more than 90 countries and speak more than 60 languages; approximately half of AIS families are from the United States and half are international.

AIS is accredited by the Council of International Schools, AdvancED and the Southern Association of Independent Schools and authorized by International Baccalaureate to offer IB programs.

History
The school opened in September 1985 in a schoolhouse rented from Sardis United Methodist Church in Buckhead with 51 students in pre-kindergarten, kindergarten and first grade. In July 1987, AIS moved into facilities located on Long Island Drive, acquired from the Fulton County Board of Education. By September of that year, the roll had grown to 193 students in kindergarten through eighth grade. Grades 9, 10, 11 and 12 were added later, with the first graduates receiving their diplomas in June 1992. Enrollment exceeded 900 students in 2008.

Under a long-term agreement with the Atlanta Board of Education, valid through the year 2045, AIS moved its campus to its current location in 1995, the site of the former North Fulton High School. The building was designed by Atlanta architect Philip Shutze, and renovations to the campus have sought to retain the historical and architectural integrity of the buildings. The campus includes science laboratories, a large library with computer facilities, an auditorium, the Lademacher Performing Arts Center, fine arts areas and an athletic complex including a gymnasium and a new soccer field and eight-lane track. In 2001, AIS secured a 50-year lease of the North Fulton Drive campus and purchased contiguous acreage.

The Adair Art, Science and Design Center opened at the start of the 2009–10 school year. It was dedicated on October 14, 2010, by Anne Cox Chambers in honor of Vee and Dick Adair. In 2012, AIS opened an Early Learning Center for 3K and 4K students, who participate in a full-immersion preschool program in Chinese, French, German and Spanish.

It was a filming location for The Blind Side, Love, Simon, and Middle School: The Worst Years of My Life.

Notable alumni
 Chris Lowell - 2003, actor
 Sophie Hawley-Weld, platinum selling record artist, composer, musician and singer of the group Sofi Tukker.

Events
The Atlanta International School has been home to many events, as well as summer camps, and guest speakers. Events that have taken place at the school include:
 World Fest, October, annually
 My Freedom Day, March 16, Annually 
 German Christmas Market, December, Annually

Notes

External links
 Atlanta International School
 IHOT Robotics

Private K-12 schools in Atlanta
International Baccalaureate schools in Georgia (U.S. state)
Educational institutions established in 1985
1985 establishments in Georgia (U.S. state)